Proteasome maturation protein is a protein that in humans is encoded by the POMP gene. It is a short-lived maturation factor required for 20S proteasome subunit biogenesis.

A single nucleotide deletion in this gene causes an autosomal recessive skin disorder, keratosis linearis with ichthyosis congenita and sclerosing keratoderma (KLICK) syndrome.

References

Further reading